Silver Cascade Falls is a waterfall located on St. Mary's Creek in the North Cheyenne Cañon Park of Colorado Springs, Colorado.

The water running over Silver Cascade originates in Buffalo Canyon, passing over St. Mary's Falls and Silver Cascade Falls before merging with North Cheyenne Creek down stream of Helen Hunt Falls.

Accessibility

Silver Cascade Falls can be reached by hiking a short but steep trail up from North Cheyenne Canyon road at the Helen Hunt Falls trail head. Care should be taken especially at the top of the falls, as the granite face of the falls is polished, slippery, and much steeper than it appears.

Images

References

See also
Waterfalls of Colorado

Waterfalls of Colorado
Landforms of El Paso County, Colorado
Parks in Colorado Springs, Colorado
Cascade waterfalls